The Sessions is a 2012 American independent drama film written and directed by Ben Lewin. It is based on an essay written by Mark O'Brien, a poet paralyzed by polio, who hired a sex surrogate to lose his virginity. John Hawkes and Helen Hunt star as O'Brien and sex surrogate Cheryl Cohen-Greene, respectively. The film premiered at the 2012 Sundance Film Festival under its original title The Surrogate and was immediately acquired by Fox Searchlight Pictures. The Sessions was released on October 19, 2012 in the United States. As of March 20, 2013, the film has earned over $9 million at the box office.

The film gathered various awards and nominations following its release, ranging from recognition of the film itself to Lewin's screenplay and the cast's acting performances, particularly those of Hawkes and Hunt. The AACTA Awards saw Lewin and Hawkes receive nominations for Best Direction and Best Actor. Hunt earned nominations for Best Supporting Actress at the 85th Academy Awards and the 66th British Academy Film Awards. The Alliance of Women Film Journalists awarded Hawkes and Hunt the Best Depiction of Nudity, Sexuality, or Seduction accolade.

Hawkes and Hunt garnered one nomination each from the 70th Golden Globe Awards. The film's international poster received a nomination from the Golden Trailer Awards, while Hawkes was named Breakthrough Actor at the Hollywood Film Festival. The Indiana Film Journalists Association nominated The Sessions for Best Picture and Hunt for Best Supporting Actress. At the 28th Independent Spirit Awards, Hawkes won Best Male Lead and Hunt won Best Supporting Female. They also went on to win Best Actor and Actress at the Nevada Film Critics Awards. Lewin collected the Audience Favorite Active Cinema Feature Award for the film at the Mill Valley Film Festival and the Audience Award at the San Sebastián International Film Festival.

The Sessions garnered six nominations from the Satellite Awards, including Best Adapted Screenplay, Best Director and Best Editing for Lisa Bromwell. Hawkes, Hunt and William H. Macy gathered nominations in the acting categories from the St. Louis Gateway Film Critics Association. At the 2012 Sundance Film Festival, The Sessions competed for the Grand Jury Prize for Dramatic Film. The film went on to win the Audience Award for Dramatic Film and the Dramatic Special Jury Prize for Ensemble Acting. Hawkes and Hunt earned nominations for Best Actor and Best Supporting Actress from both the Vancouver Film Critics Circle and the Washington D.C. Area Film Critics Association. Hawkes received a total of twenty-four nominations for his portrayal of O'Brien, while Hunt received twenty-six for her role as Cohen Greene.

Awards and nominations

References
General

Specific

External links
 

Lists of accolades by film